Spiker may refer to:

 Spike driver, a piece of rail transport maintenance of way equipment for driving spikes
 Spiker (film), 1986 sports drama
 Spiker (surname)

See also 
 Spike (disambiguation)
 Spyker (disambiguation)